In enzymology, a 4-chlorobenzoyl-CoA dehalogenase is an enzyme that catalyzes the chemical reaction

4-chlorobenzoyl-CoA + H2O  4-hydroxybenzoyl CoA + chloride

Thus, the two substrates of this enzyme are 4-chlorobenzoyl-CoA and H2O, whereas its two products are 4-hydroxybenzoyl CoA and chloride.

This enzyme belongs to the family of hydrolases, specifically those acting on halide bonds in carbon-halide compounds.  The systematic name of this enzyme class is 4-chlorobenzoyl CoA chlorohydrolase. This enzyme participates in 2,4-dichlorobenzoate degradation.

References

 
 

EC 3.8.1
Enzymes of unknown structure